This is a list of compositions by composer George Onslow.


With opus numbers

 Op. 1, 3 String Quintets; 1806
 Op. 2, Sonata for Piano; 1806
 Op. 3, 3 Trios for Piano, Violin, and Violoncello; 1806
 Op. 4, 3 String Quartets; 1806
 Op. 5, Scottish Airs for Piano; 1810
 Op. 6, Toccata for Piano; 1810
 Op. 7, Sonata for Piano Four Hands; 1811
 Op. 8, 3 String Quartets; about 1812
 Op. 9, 3 String Quartets; about 1812
 Op. 10, 3 String Quartets; about 1812
 Op. 11, 3 Sonatas for Violin and Piano; 1816
 Op. 12, Variations On "Charming Gabrielle" for Piano; 1817
 Op. 13, Variations On "As Soon As The Light" for Piano; 1817
 Op. 14, 3 Trios for Piano, Violin, and Violoncello; 1818
 Op. 15, Sonata for Violin and Piano; 1819
 Op. 16, 3 Sonatas for Viola / Violoncello and Piano; 1819
 Op. 17, String Quintet; 1821
 Op. 18, String Quintet; 1821
 Op. 19, String Quintet; 1821
 Op. 20, Trio for Piano, Violin, and Violoncello; 1822
 Op. 21, 3 String Quartets; 1822
 Op. 22, Sonata for Piano Four Hands; 1823
 Op. 23, String Quintet; 1823
 Op. 24, String Quintet; 1823
 Op. 25, String Quintet; 1823
 Op. 26, Trio for Piano, Violin, and Violoncello; 1824
 Op. 27, Trio for Piano, Violin, and Violoncello; 1824
 Op. 28, English Theme for Piano; 1824
 Op. 29, Sonata for Violin and Piano; 1824
 Op. 30, Sextet for Piano and Winds; 1825
 Op. 31, Sonata for Violin and Piano; 1825
 Op. 32, String Quintet; 1826
 Op. 33, String Quintet; 1827/8
 Op. 34, String Quintet; 1827/8
 Op. 35, String Quintet; 1827/8
 Op. 36, 3 String Quartets; 1828
 Op. 37, String Quintet; 1828
 Op. 38, String Quintet; 1829
 Op. 39, String Quintet; 1830
 Op. 40, String Quintet; 1830
 Op. 41, First Symphony; 1830
 Op. 42, Second Symphony; 1831
 Op. 43, String Quintet; 1832
 Op. 44, String Quintet; 1832
 Op. 45, String Quintet; 1832
 Op. 46, 3 String Quartets; 1832/3
 Op. 47, String Quartet; 1832/3
 Op. 48, String Quartet; 1833
 Op. 49, String Quartet; 1833
 Op. 50, String Quartet; 1833
 Op. 51, String Quintet; 1834
 Op. 52, String Quartet; 1834
 Op. 53, String Quartet; 1834
 Op. 54, String Quartet; 1834
 Op. 55, String Quartet; 1834
 Op. 56, String Quartet; 1834
 Op. 57, String Quintet; 1835
 Op. 58, String Quintet; 1836
 Op. 59, String Quintet; 1837
 Op. 60, Piece Arranged in two suites for string quartet; 1837
 Op. 61, String Quintet; 1837
 Op. 62, String Quartet; 1841
 Op. 63, String Quartet; 1841
 Op. 64, String Quartet; 1841
 Op. 65, String Quartet; 1842
 Op. 66, String Quartet; 1843
 Op. 67, String Quintet; 1843
 Op. 68, String Quintet; 1844
 Op. 69, String Quartet; 1845/6
 Op. 70, Quintet for Piano and Strings; 1846
 Op. 71, Fourth Symphony; 1846
 Op. 72, String Quintet; 1847/8
 Op. 73, String Quintet; 1847/8
 Op. 74, String Quintet; 1847/8
 Op. 75, String Quintet; 1847/8
 Op. 76, Quintet for Piano and Strings; 1848
 Op. 77a, Nonet for Winds and Strings; 1848
 Op. 77b, Sextet for Winds and Strings; 1848
 Op. 78, String Quintet; 1848
 Op. 79a, Septet for Piano, Winds, and Contrabass; 1849
 Op. 79b, Quintet for Piano and Strings; 1849
 Op. 80, String Quintet; 1849/50
 Op. 81, Wind Quintet; 1850
 Op. 82, String Quintet; 1850
 Op. 83, Trio for Piano, Violin, and Violoncello; 1851

Without opus numbers

 Six Pieces for Piano; ?
 The Two Uncles: opera; 1806 – unpublished
 Sonata For Piano; about 1806 – unpublished
 The Bodyguard: romance; 1815
 The Mayor Of La Vega: lyrical drama; 1822–4
 "Andante" for Piano; 1824
 "Spring": vocal nocturne; about 1825
 "The Young Greeks": chorus with couplets; 1826
 The Book Peddler, Or The Lumberjack's Son: comic opera; 1826
 The First Christian Baron: romance; about 1829
 Third Symphony; 1833/4 (expanded from string quintet opus 32)
 "Ave Maria" for four voices; 1835
 Dante in Paradise: vocal ballad; about 1835 – unpublished
 Le duc de Guise, ou Les ėtats de Blois: opéra comique; 1837
 Trio; 1841 – unpublished
 "Andantino" for oboe and piano; 1843 – unpublished
 "Allegro Agitato" for piano in G minor; 1844 – unpublished
 "Allegro Agitato" for piano in B minor; ? – unpublished
 "Allegro Moderato" in F minor; ? – unpublished
 "Andantino Con Moto" for piano in E minor; 1844 – unpublished
 "Daydream" for piano; 1844
 "Cain, The Cursed, Or Abel's Death": dramatic scene; 1845
 Fantasy for Piano on "The Guardian Angel"; 1849
 "The Regrets!": romance; ?

External links
 

 
Onslow